Irish Eyes is the fifth of the Nuala Anne McGrail series of mystery novels by Roman Catholic priest and author Father Andrew M. Greeley. The cover art was illustrated by Michael Koelsch.

References

2000 American novels
Nuala Anne McGrail series
Novels by Andrew M. Greeley
Forge Books books